Guardia Republicana is a Peruvian football club, playing in the city of Lima.

The club were founded 1981 and play in the Copa Perú which is the third division of the Peruvian league.

History
The club was 1985, 1987, and 1995 Segunda División Peruana champion.

The club have played at the highest level of Peruvian football on three occasions, from 1986 Torneo Descentralizado until 1988 Torneo Descentralizado, when was relegated. The team returned to the Peruvian First Division in 1996 (Torneo Descentralizado), but was relegated at the end of the same year. To this day he has not returned to professional football.

Honours

National
Peruvian Segunda División: 3
Winners (2): 1985, 1987, 1995
Runner-up (1): 1993

Regional
Liga Provincial de Lima:
Winners (1): 1985
Runner-up (1): 1984

See also
List of football clubs in Peru
Peruvian football league system

Football clubs in Lima
Association football clubs established in 1981
Military association football clubs